Sand bubbler crabs (or sand-bubblers) are crabs of the genera Scopimera and Dotilla in the family Dotillidae. They are small crabs that live on sandy beaches in the tropical Indo-Pacific. They feed by filtering sand through their mouthparts, leaving behind balls of sand that are disintegrated by the incoming high tide.

Description
A similar system has evolved in parallel in the porcelain crab genus Petrolisthes.

Distribution
Sand bubbler crabs are widespread across the Indo-Pacific region, where they occur abundantly on sandy beaches in the tropics and sub-tropics.

Ecology and behaviour

Sand bubbler crabs live in burrows in the sand, where they remain during high tide. When the tide is out, they emerge on to the surface of the sand, and pass the sand through their mouthparts, eating detritus and plankton, and discarding the processed sand as pellets, which cover the beach. The crabs work radially from the entrance to their burrows, which they re-enter as the tide rises and disintegrates the pellets. In each burrow, the crab waits out the high tide in a bubble of air. The material consumed by sand bubbler crabs has a very low concentration of organic matter, which is concentrated by egestion of indigestible material.

Taxonomy

Taxonomic history
The first sand bubbler crab to be described was Cancer sulcatus (now Dotilla sulcata) by Peter Forsskål in 1775. The genus Scopimera was originally described as a subgenus of Ocypode by Wilhem de Haan in 1833, although the first species, Scopimera globosa was not validly described until 1835. At the same time, De Haan tried to erect the genus Doto for Forskål's Cancer sulcatus, not realising that the name was preoccupied by the mollusc genus Doto. The first available name for that genus was published by William Stimpson in 1858, who called it Dotilla. Ongoing revisions are likely to split the current genus Scopimera into at least two genera.

Species
Eight species of Dotilla and fifteen of Scopimera are currently recognised:

 Dotilla
Dotilla blanfordi Alcock, 1900
Dotilla fenestrata Hilgendorf, 1869
Dotilla intermedia De Man, 1888
Dotilla malabarica Nobili, 1903
Dotilla myctiroides (H. Milne-Edwards, 1852)
Dotilla pertinax Kemp, 1915
Dotilla sulcata (Forskål, 1775)
Dotilla wichmani De Man, 1892

Scopimera
Scopimera bitympana Shen, 1930
Scopimera crabicauda Alcock, 1900
Scopimera curtelsoma Shen, 1936
Scopimera globosa (De Haan, 1835)
Scopimera gordonae Serène & Moosa, 1981
Scopimera inflata A. Milne-Edwards, 1873
Scopimera intermedia Balss, 1934
Scopimera investigatoris Alcock, 1900
Scopimera kochi Roux, 1917
Scopimera longidactyla Shen, 1932
Scopimera philippinensis Wong, Shih & Chan, 2011
Scopimera pilula Kemp, 1919
Scopimera proxima Kemp, 1919
Scopimera sheni Wong, Shih & Chan, 2011
Scopimera sigillorum (Rathbun, 1914)

References

External links

Ocypodoidea
Arthropod common names